Vita Group Limited (Vita Group) is an Australian retailer that operates under the brands of Artisan Aesthetic Clinics. Vita Group employs 400 people across its network of brands and is an ASX listed company that in 2020 reported revenues of $773.1 million.

Vita Group was founded by Maxine Horne, who is currently Chief Executive Officer to provide Australians with retail outlets where they could purchase mobile phones and other telecommunication products and services. The company commenced trading in 1995 as a Telstra Licensed Dealer under the brand Fone Zone, with its first store opening at Pacific Fair Shopping Centre on the Gold Coast. By 2005, Fone Zone had expanded to more than 100 stores Australia-wide and had listed on the Australian Stock Exchange.

Background
From 2005 to 2008, Fone Zone continued to expand and diversify through acquisitions, purchasing Telstra dealer, One Zero Communications in 2005, and Apple reseller, Next Byte in 2007. In 2008, the company officially changed its name to Vita Group Limited.

In 2009, after nearly 15 years as a Telstra Licensed Dealer, Vita Group signed a Dealer and Master Licence Agreement with Telstra, which saw Vita acquire 100 Telstra branded stores.

Vita Group continued to expand from 2010 to 2015, entering the information and communication technology (ICT) sector through acquiring Camelon IT, which it later rebranded to Vita Enterprise Solutions.

By mid-2015, the company had nearly 150 points of presence across Australia, including 100 Telstra Licensed Stores, 16 Telstra Business Centres, five Fone Zone outlets, 16 One Zero stores and 12 Next Byte stores.

In December 2015, Vita Group made the decision to close its Next Byte brand.

In 2016, the company announced the extension of its Telstra Dealer and Master Lincence Agreement to 2020.

The following year, Vita Group further diversified, expanding into the non-invasive medical aesthetics sector by acquiring Clear Complexions. In 2018, the group added to its portfolio in this market by acquiring Artisan Cosmetic & Rejuvenation Clinic, Fortitude Valley and by launching its own premium medical aesthetics brand, Artisan Aesthetic Clinics.

Today, Vita Group has more than 130 points of presence across Australia, consisting of Telstra Licensed Stores, Telstra Business Centres, and Fone Zone outlets. The company also operates the brands, Sprout, Artisan Aesthetic Clinics, and Vita Enterprise Solutions.

References

Retail companies of Australia